Liu Yudong (nickname: "War God"; b. 1970 in Putian, Fujian), is a retired Chinese professional basketball player who last played for the Fujian Xunxing club in the Chinese Basketball Association (CBA). At 2.00 m (6'6 ") and 243 lbs. (110 kg), he played at the power forward position. In 1990, he was chosen as one of China's 50 all-time greatest basketball players. He held the CBA record for most career points scored (8,387 points), until it was broken by Zhu Fangyu, on 1/1/2012. He was the CBA Regular Season MVP in 2002, and the CBA League MVP in 2002 and 2003, and is known as one of the greatest Chinese players of all-time.

Professional career
Liu spent his first eight CBA seasons with the Bayi Rockets (1995–2003), where he became the second best scorer in CBA history, with a scoring average of 27.9 points per game. He was reportedly offered a contract by the Denver Nuggets in 1998, but turned it down as he would not be able to play for the national team. After winning the CBA championship in all but one season – 2002, to a Yao Ming-led Shanghai Sharks team, Liu retired in 2003, because of a knee injury. He came back the next season, and was voted to the CBA All-Star Game. Liu retired again in 2005, due to his troublesome knees, and he became an assistant coach for the Rockets. In 2007, Liu came out of a two-year retirement to lead the Fujian Xinxing and retired for the last time in 2009 at the age of 39.

Statistics

CBA Statistics

Personal life and player profile
Liu is a senior colonel in the People's Liberation Army. He was also the flag bearer of the Chinese sports delegation at the opening ceremony of the 1996 Summer Olympics and 2000 Summer Olympics.

Liu is known for being one of the most lethal scorers in international basketball of all-time, with his signature mid-range jumper, often leading him to be referred as "中距离王 (Mid-range King)" by fans throughout China. Liu was also a very clutch player throughout his career, having many of his best games in the playoffs including a 53-point, 15-rebound performance against the Shanghai Sharks in game 4 of the 2001 CBA finals, clinching that year's championship.

Liu was one of the greatest players that China has ever produced, and one of 3 Chinese players in the 1990s that was offered a contract by an NBA team. In an exhibition prior to the 1996 Olympics, Liu scored 24 points and added 7 rebounds against Team USA in an 81-118 loss. Liu was a pure scorer at 2.00m and 243 lbs, but a lack of conditioning later in his career cost him a string of injuries that derailed the twilight years of his career.

Sources
Yao Ming: The Road to the NBA by C.F. Xiao, translated by Philip Robyn, Page 139

References

External links
 
 

1970 births
Living people
Bayi Rockets players
Fujian Sturgeons players
People from Putian
Power forwards (basketball)
Basketball players from Fujian
Chinese men's basketball players
Olympic basketball players of China
Basketball players at the 1996 Summer Olympics
Basketball players at the 2000 Summer Olympics
Asian Games medalists in basketball
Asian Games gold medalists for China
Asian Games silver medalists for China
Basketball players at the 1994 Asian Games
Basketball players at the 1998 Asian Games
Basketball players at the 2002 Asian Games
Medalists at the 1994 Asian Games
Medalists at the 1998 Asian Games
Medalists at the 2002 Asian Games
2002 FIBA World Championship players
1994 FIBA World Championship players